José Luis Cuas (born June 28, 1994) is a Dominican-American professional baseball pitcher for the Kansas City Royals of Major League Baseball (MLB). He made his MLB debut in 2022.

Amateur career
Cuas attended Grand Street Campus High School in Brooklyn, New York. Cuas was drafted by the Toronto Blue Jays in the 40th round of the 2012 MLB draft but did not sign. He attended the University of Maryland where he played college baseball for the Terrapins. In 2014, he played collegiate summer baseball with the Wareham Gatemen of the Cape Cod Baseball League. Cuas was a three-year starter as an infielder at Maryland, and enjoyed his best season as a junior in 2015, hitting .242/.329/.442/.771 with 11 home runs and 53 RBI. He was drafted by the Milwaukee Brewers in the 11th round of the 2015 MLB draft and signed with them.

Professional career

Milwaukee Brewers
Cuas spent his debut season of 2015 with the Helena Brewers, hitting .260/.319/.430/.749 with 7 home runs and 40 RBI. He spent the 2017 season with the Brevard County Manatees, hitting .170/.263/.240/.503 with 4 home runs and 27 RBI. Cuas split the 2017 season between the Wisconsin Timber Rattlers and the Carolina Mudcats, hitting a combined .187/.277/.321/.598 with 5 home runs and 28 RBI.

Cuas was converted to a pitcher prior to the 2018 season. He opened the season with Wisconsin, going 2–0 with an 8.38 ERA over  innings before being released on July 10.

Long Island Ducks
He signed with the Long Island Ducks of the Atlantic League and finished the season with them going 2–1 with a 2.38 ERA and 17 strikeouts over  innings. Cuas opened the 2019 season back with Long Island.

It was with the Ducks that Cuas began pitching sidearm. Cuas had been throwing sidearm while warming up until, on the advice of Ducks teammate Francisco Rodríguez, he began to work on throwing sidearm full-time.

Arizona Diamondbacks
He was signed by the Arizona Diamondbacks on May 25. Between the Hillsboro Hops, the Kane County Cougars, and the Visalia Rawhide, Cuas posted a combined 6–3 record with a 1.60 ERA and 25 strikeouts over 45 innings. Cuas was released by Arizona and did not play in 2020 due to the cancellation of the Minor League Baseball season because of the COVID-19 pandemic. Cuas took a job as a FedEx delivery driver during the day and trained with his younger brother in a park in Brooklyn at night.

Kansas City Royals
Cuas opened the 2021 season back with the Long Island Ducks and threw 11 scoreless innings before being signed by the Kansas City Royals.

Cuas split his affiliated time in 2021 between the ACL Royals, the Northwest Arkansas, and the Omaha Storm Chasers, going a combined 5–1 with a 1.51 ERA and 44 strikeouts over  innings. He received a non-roster invitation to MLB spring training in 2022.

On May 30, Kansas City selected Cuas' contract and promoted him to the Major Leagues for the first time. He made his Major League debut the following day against the Cleveland Guardians. He struck out the first batter he faced, Oscar Mercado, and retired the next two hitters in order for a perfect inning of relief.

Personal life
At the time of his Major League debut, Cuas had a four-year-old son and one-year-old daughter with his longtime girlfriend.

His younger brother, Alex, played college baseball at Towson.

See also
 List of Major League Baseball players from the Dominican Republic

References

External links

Maryland Terrapins bio

1994 births
Living people
American sportspeople of Dominican Republic descent
Sportspeople from Santo Domingo
Sportspeople from Brooklyn
Baseball players from New York City
Major League Baseball players from the Dominican Republic
Baseball infielders
Major League Baseball pitchers
Kansas City Royals players
Maryland Terrapins baseball players
Wareham Gatemen players
Helena Brewers players
Wisconsin Timber Rattlers players
Brevard County Manatees players
Carolina Mudcats players
Long Island Ducks players
Hillsboro Hops players
Kane County Cougars players
Visalia Rawhide players
Tigres del Licey players
Águilas Cibaeñas players
Arizona Complex League Royals players
Northwest Arkansas Naturals players
Omaha Storm Chasers players
Dominican Republic emigrants to the United States